Light (formerly Light: A Quarterly of Light Verse) is an online journal which bills itself as "America's oldest and best-known journal of light verse."

History and profile
Light was founded as a print journal in 1992 by retired postal worker John Mella. Mella personally published the journal until 2008, when he founded the non-profit Foundation for Light Verse with a $500,000 gift from poet Joyce La Mers.  The Foundation, headed by Mella, took over publication of the journal. After Mella's death in 2012, the magazine was relaunched as an online-only, semiannual publication, edited by his handpicked successor, poet Melissa Balmain. The all-volunteer staff includes poets Kevin Durkin, Allison Joseph, Julie Kane, and Gail White.

The verse in each issue begins with a feature on a writer of light verse. Sections in between vary from issue to issue, and have included "Spectrum" roundups on types of light verse (Little Willies, "impossible rhymes," etc.); book reviews by Barbara Egel; and an occasional column, "Historical and Hysterical," by A. M. Juster. The magazine has published the verse of Wendy Cope, Thomas M. Disch, X. J. Kennedy, John Updike, and Richard Wilbur, among many others.

Contributors
Notable contributors include the following:

References

2. Nicol, Alfred (August 2, 2013), "A New Morning for Light" A New Morning for Light.

External links
Light

Biannual magazines published in the United States
Defunct literary magazines published in the United States
Magazines established in 1992
Magazines disestablished in 2012
Magazines published in Chicago
Online literary magazines published in the United States
Online magazines with defunct print editions
Poetry magazines published in the United States
Quarterly magazines published in the United States